The George V Bridge is a road and tram bridge that crosses the Loire in Orléans, France.  It is an arched masonry bridge spanning a distance of 325 m.  Designed by Jean Hupeau, it was built between 1751 and 1760, at the request of Daniel-Charles Trudaine, administrator and civil engineer. It was renamed in honour of King George V after the World War I out of respect of Britain's role in the war.

Buildings and structures in Orléans
Transport in Centre-Val de Loire